The Women competition at the 2017 World Championships was held on 28 and 29 July 2017.

Results
The first round was held on 28 July at 12:30. The second to fourth round was held on 29 July at 12:15.

References

Women
World